Bøn Station lies on the Trunk Line in Eidsvoll municipality, Norway, and was opened as a stop in 1858. The station lies 62.24 kilometres from Oslo S and is 134 metres above sea level. The station building was built in 1884. 

The buildings at the station are important, with the station building (1874) and the goods house (1853) at Bøn the only original buildings remaining on the Trunk Line. In January 2009, the goods house at Bøn burnt down.

Historical data 
 1884 Station built
 1965 Became remote controlled
 1989 No longer attended
 2004 Preservation recommended by the Nasjonal verneplan for kulturminner i jernbanen del II
 2004 13 June 2004 - Trains no longer stopped at Bøn Station. Local train, NSB route 440 (Drammen - Skøyen - Oslo S - Dal - Eidsvoll) now only runs to Dal Station.

Railway stations on the Trunk Line
Railway stations in Eidsvoll
Railway stations opened in 1858
Railway stations closed in 2004
1858 establishments in Norway